Jürgen Schläder (born 1948 in Hagen) is a German theatre director and musicologist, who was from May 1987 to March 2014 Professor of Theatre Studies with a focus on stage music at the LMU München.

He studied German literature and musicology at the Ruhr-University Bochum and achieved his doctorate in musicology in 1978 with the dissertation Undine in stage music. In 1986 he habilitated on the subject of Das Opernduett. A 19th century scene type and its prehistory. His current research focuses are: Aesthetic foundations and analysis of contemporary directorial theatre, experimental forms of modern music for theatre and the history of the Bavarian State Opera in the 20th century.

External links 
 
 Prof. Dr. Jürgen Schläder (LMU)
 Jürgen Schläder
 Jürgen Schläder (LMU)
 Jürgen Schläder (Bayerische StaatsOper)
 Jürgen Schläder (Hg.): Werner Egk: Eine Debatte zwischen Ästhetik und Politik (LMU)
 Jürgen Schläder Höllenspuk als Spiegel der Erkenntnis Zauberei und Liebe in Händels Oper Rinaldo Springer
 Jürgen Schläder on YouTube

Academic staff of the Ludwig Maximilian University of Munich
German musicologists
1948 births
Living people
People from Hagen